Boise is the capital of the U.S. state of Idaho.

Boise may also refer to:
Boise, Texas
Boise, Portland, Oregon
Boise City, Oklahoma
Boise County, Idaho
Boise (CL-47), a light cruiser commissioned in 1938
Boise (SSN-764), a Los Angeles-class nuclear attack submarine
Boise National Forest, a US national forest north and east of the city of Boise, Idaho
Boise River

People with the surname
Reuben P. Boise (1819-1907), former chief justice of the Oregon Supreme Court
Charles Watson Boise (1884-1964), mining engineer and a sponsor of Louis Leakey

See also
Boise Cascade, a pulp and paper products company